Shane Walsh (16 November 1976)  is a Paralympic swimming competitor from Australia.  He was born at the Gold Coast, Queensland with cerebral palsy.  He won a silver medal at the 2000 Sydney Games in the Men's 4 × 100 m Freestyle 34 pts event. He was an Australian Institute of Sport paralympic swimming scholarship holder in 2000. 
After the Games,  he has managed bars and restaurants across the Gold Coast. In 2008, he took part in Surf Life Saving Queensland's Skills for Life Community Program.

References

Male Paralympic swimmers of Australia
Swimmers at the 2000 Summer Paralympics
Paralympic silver medalists for Australia
Australian Institute of Sport Paralympic swimmers
Living people
1976 births
Medalists at the 2000 Summer Paralympics
Paralympic medalists in swimming
Australian male freestyle swimmers
S8-classified Paralympic swimmers